Ngulgule is an ethnic group of South Sudan  living just north of the confluence of the Sopo and Boro rivers. They are one of seven distinct ethnicities comprising the Daju people. They speak Njalgulgule, a Nilo-Saharan language. Most of them are Muslims. The population of this group is 900.

References

External sources
Language Map of Sudan Huffman, Steve

Ethnic groups in South Sudan